Ishref Sokratovich Magomedov (born 6 October 1980) is a former Russian footballer.

Club career
He made his Russian Football National League debut for FC Anzhi Makhachkala on 16 April 2003 in a game against FC Baltika Kaliningrad. He played for one more season in the FNL for Anzhi.

External links
 

1980 births
Living people
Russian footballers
Association football forwards
Russian expatriate footballers
Expatriate footballers in Moldova
Expatriate footballers in Belarus
Russian expatriate sportspeople in Moldova
FC Anzhi Makhachkala players
FC Nistru Otaci players
FC Torpedo-BelAZ Zhodino players
FC Shakhtyor Soligorsk players
FC Sokol Saratov players
FC Orenburg players
FC Torpedo Vladimir players